Gonocephalum depressum is a species of darkling beetle. The species is widespread in South Asian and South East Asian countries such as, India, Bhutan, Nepal, Pakistan, Indonesia, Laos, Philippines, Sri Lanka, Myanmar, Taiwan, Afghanistan and China.

In Kerala, India, the larva of the beetle is considered as a pest of sweet potato. The seeds of Aeginetia pedunculata are known to attack by the adults where infestations are common during October to November. It is also a predator of the pest Chilo partellus.

Gallery

References 

Tenebrionidae
Insects of Sri Lanka
Insects of India
Insects described in 1801
Insects of Nepal